Maryland Route 470 (MD 470) is a state highway in the U.S. state of Maryland.  Known as Oakley Road, the state highway runs north  between intersections with MD 242 in Avenue and Dynard.  MD 470 loops through Oakley in western St. Mary's County.  The state highway was constructed in the early 1930s.

Route description

MD 470 begins at an intersection with MD 242 (Colton Point Road) in the community of Avenue. The state highway immediately intersects Abell Road, which heads east toward the community of Abell. The state highway crosses Canoe Neck Creek before curving north through the hamlet of Oakley. MD 470 passes All Saints Episcopal Church, then crosses Tomakokin Creek and reaches its northern terminus at MD 242 (Colton Point Road) near the hamlet of Dynard.

History
MD 470 was constructed as a gravel road in three sections in the early 1930s.  The first section was constructed from Avenue to just north of Canoe Neck Creek starting in 1930.  That first section and the second section from Canoe Neck Creek through Oakley to south of Tomakokin Creek were completed by 1933.  The final section north to Dynard was started in 1934 and completed in 1935.  Aside from widening and paving, MD 470 has changed very little from when it was first constructed.

Junction list

See also

References

External links

 MDRoads: MD 470

470
Maryland Route 470